KQNG (720 AM) was a radio station broadcasting a Classic Country format. Licensed to Kekaha, Hawaii, United States, the station served the Kauai area. The station was owned by Ohana Broadcast Company LLC and featured programming from CNN Radio.
The station went on the air as KUAI on June 20, 1965. At the time, its tower was the westernmost in the United States, on land owned by the McBryde Sugar Company. It was owned by the American Islands Broadcasting Corporation, which was a business of Richard Hobby and Ron Gay. Charles T. Erickson bought the station in late 1966; he sold it to John Short and William Dale in 1975.

KQNG's license was surrendered on March 22, 2016, and cancelled by the Federal Communications Commission on the same day.

References

External links
FCC Station Search Details: DKQNG (Facility ID: 1752)
FCC History Cards for KQNG (covering 1962-1980 as KUAI)

Ohana Broadcast Company, LLC stations
QNG (AM)
Defunct radio stations in the United States
Radio stations disestablished in 2016
2016 disestablishments in Hawaii
Radio stations established in 1965
1965 establishments in Hawaii
QNG